is a fishing video game for the Nintendo 64. It was released only in Japan in 1998. It was followed by a sequel Nushi Tsuri 64: Shiokaze Ninotte in 2000.

There are six characters from which players can choose from before they start the game. Like in most role-playing games, the town can be freely explored in addition to other towns. The stuff that be purchased is mostly fishing-related. Random encounters can occur while walking; players can choose to throw rocks to chase them away or run across a path in order to reach safety.

See also
List of River King video games

References

1998 video games
Fishing video games
Games with Transfer Pak support
Japan-exclusive video games
Marvelous Entertainment franchises
Nintendo 64 games
Nintendo 64-only games
Pack-In-Video games
Single-player video games
Victor Interactive Software games
Video games developed in Japan